Charlie Hickey (born September 28, 1999) is an American indie rock musician from Pasadena, California. Hickey is currently signed to Phoebe Bridgers’ Saddest Factory Records.

Life and career
Charlie Dworsky-Hickey was born in Pasadena, California on September 28, 1999. Hickey is the son of American singer-songwriter and playback singer Sally Dworsky and songwriter Chris Hickey. He began collaborating with musician Phoebe Bridgers after posting a cover of her song "Radar" on YouTube in 2013. His first EP titled Odds released through SoundCloud in April 2014 and featured Bridgers as collaborator. He released songs and covers independently through SoundCloud and YouTube until the release of Count The Stairs in June 2021, which was released through Saddest Factory Records. Hickey's song "Ten Feet Tall" from the EP features Phoebe Bridgers. In March 2022, Hickey announced his debut album, Nervous At Night, to be released on May 20. Along with the album announcement, Hickey released the song "Nervous At Night", which was one of the first songs written for the album.

Discography
Studio albums
Nervous At Night (2022, Saddest Factory)
EPs
Count The Stairs (2021, Saddest Factory)
Singles
"Nervous At Night" (2022, Saddest Factory/Dead Oceans/Secretly Group)

References

Living people
American rock musicians
Musicians from Pasadena, California
1999 births